Marek Gawkowski (born 15 May 1965) is a Polish rower. He competed in the men's quadruple sculls event at the 1992 Summer Olympics.

References

External links
 

1965 births
Living people
Polish male rowers
Olympic rowers of Poland
Rowers at the 1992 Summer Olympics
Sportspeople from Szczecin